PXL may refer to:
 PXL-2000, camcorder
 Paclitaxel, drug
 PCL 6 Enhanced, printer command language